The Quiksilver Pro Gold Coast 2019 was the first event of the Men's Championship Tour in the 2019 World Surf League. It took place at Coolangatta in Gold Coast, Queensland, and was contested by 36 surfers.

The event window was 3 to 13 April, but the competition was completed between 3 and 8 April.

Italo Ferreira defeated Kolohe Andino in the final to win the fourth World Surf League event of his career.

Format

A new competition format was introduced for the 2019 Championship Tour. All 36 surfers take part in Round 1. The top two surfers in each heat advance directly to Round 3, while the lowest-placed surfer in each heat enters Round 2. In each of the four heats in Round 2, the top two surfers advance to Round 3, while the lowest-placed surfer is eliminated from the competition. From Round 3 onwards, all heats are head-to-head, with the winner advancing to the next round and the loser being eliminated.

Competition

The competition started on 3 April, with the final taking place on 8 April.

Round 1

Round 2

Round 3

Round 4

Quarterfinals

Semifinals

Final

References

External links
 World Surf League

2019 World Surf League
Surfing competitions
2019 in Australian sport
Sport on the Gold Coast, Queensland
April 2019 sports events in Australia